Ameromyia is a genus of antlions belonging to the family Myrmeleontidae.

The species of this genus are found in Southern America.

Species:

Ameromyia dimidiata 
Ameromyia hirsuta 
Ameromyia modesta 
Ameromyia muralli 
Ameromyia nigriventris 
Ameromyia pentheri 
Ameromyia pleuralis 
Ameromyia protensa 
Ameromyia pubiventris 
Ameromyia stevensi 
Ameromyia strigosa 
Ameromyia tendinosa

References

Myrmeleontinae
Myrmeleontidae genera